More Hot Rocks (Big Hits & Fazed Cookies) is a compilation album by the Rolling Stones released in December 1972 on London Records. The album was a follow-up to the hugely successful Hot Rocks 1964–1971.

When Hot Rocks 1964–1971 proved to be a big seller, there was never any doubt that a successor would follow. However, initially—with Andrew Loog Oldham getting involved—the project was to feature previously unreleased (or more accurately, discarded) material and be titled Necrophilia. Artwork was prepared and the album made it as far as the mastering phase when it was recalled and something a little more practical was compiled (ABKCO would revisit this concept with 1975's Metamorphosis). The result was More Hot Rocks (Big Hits & Fazed Cookies).

This was the second "post-contract" compilation released under the aegis of London/ABKCO Records after the termination of the Stones relationship with ABKCO and Decca Records.  Because of the nature of the contract, the Rolling Stones lost all control over their pre-1971 recordings and this album was released without their input or consent.  ABKCO and Decca would continue to release such un-authorized albums over the next several decades.

Release and reception

Featuring the hits that could not be shoehorned onto its predecessor, as well as first-time release of many previously UK-only releases, the double album was quickly pressed and distributed into North American shops in December 1972, reaching No. 9 in the US and going gold. Like Hot Rocks 1964–1971, More Hot Rocks (Big Hits & Fazed Cookies) would not see an official UK release until 21 May 1990.

Allmusic's Richie Unterberger writes in his review "More Hot Rocks goes for the somewhat smaller hits, some of the better album tracks, and a whole LP side's worth of rarities that hadn't yet been available in the United States when this compilation was released in 1972."

"Despite the unfathomable choices, random LP tracks, peculiar chronology ('64 through to '69, then back to '63/'64 again) and the feeling that the real stormers are elsewhere (on 'Vol 1', that is), it's an irresistible listen," wrote Select'''s Andrew Perry of the 1990 CD release, concluding, "A weird arrangement of quality goods."

Liner notes
Andrew Loog Oldham's liner notes, as preserved on the CD releases, read:
"way back when / the sleepy owls of the brill building / brillcreamed and braincreamed that melody was coming back / and lo it had / it flew past their windows yesterday / as Paulie, a bebeatled ballade / Lennon's advocate for the Kalin Twins (who is the other jaggered half?) / seen so far away / and today will never come to the Judas Iscariots / who mock the hands that feed them / from here within / December's Children and the Aftermath of the war of the parking lots / stay away from new caddies, they're faulty / stick with our original edsel / the 17 + 8 / 8 from the brown cookie bag baked yesteryear and preserved and never before sold in your local deli / that remained (excuse me Mr Gershwin, I need another dime) standards of yesterday and now / good times, bad times to you all and have you seen your mother baby, balling in the alley"

Track listing
All songs by Mick Jagger and Keith Richards, except where noted.

All tracks on sides one, two, and four were produced by Andrew Loog Oldham, except "Money" and "Bye Bye Johnnie", which were produced by Eric Easton. Side three was produced by Jimmy Miller, except tracks "She's a Rainbow" and "2000 Light Years from Home", produced by The Rolling Stones.  "Poison Ivy" is version 1, although not designated as such on the 1972 release.

 2002 bonus tracks 
In August 2002, More Hot Rocks (Big Hits & Fazed Cookies) was reissued in a new remastered CD and SACD digipak by ABKCO Records with the addition of three bonus tracks: "Everybody Needs Somebody to Love", from The Rolling Stones No. 2, a different, longer take than the version on the 1965 US release The Rolling Stones, Now!; "Poison Ivy" (version 2) from The Rolling Stones EP; and "I've Been Loving You Too Long", recorded in 1965, and later overdubbed with audience noise for the 1966 American-only live album Got Live If You Want It!''. "Poison Ivy" (version 2) was produced by Eric Easton, while the other two bonus tracks were produced by Andrew Loog Oldham.  In addition to the three bonus tracks, the songs on CD two after "What to Do" were re-ordered as follows:

Charts and certifications

Charts

Certification

References

The Rolling Stones compilation albums
1972 compilation albums
ABKCO Records compilation albums
London Records compilation albums
Albums produced by Andrew Loog Oldham
Albums produced by Jimmy Miller